Sir Edmund Fortescue, 1st Baronet (baptised 22 September 1642 – 30 December 1666) was an English politician, MP for Plympton Erle.

He was the second son of Sir Edmund Fortescue of Fallapit and his wife Jane, daughter of Thomas Southcote.

He was educated at Balliol College, Oxford, matriculating in 1658.

He married Margery, daughter of Henry Sandys, 5th Baron Sandys. They had one son and two daughters:
 Sir Sandys Fortescue, 2nd Baronet (1661–1683)
 Jane Fortescue (1662–1682), married William Coleman
 Sarah Fortescue (1664–1685)

He was knighted and created a baronet on 31 March 1664, and elected MP for Plympton Erle in October 1666. He died on 30 December 1666, and was buried at East Allington.

References

1642 births
1666 deaths
Alumni of Balliol College, Oxford
English MPs 1661–1679
Baronets in the Baronetage of England
Members of the Parliament of England for Plympton Erle